Cradley Heathens was a motorcycle speedway team from Dudley, England. The team was founded in 1947 and competed at the top level of British speedway until its closure in 1995. It was revived as Dudley Heathens in 2010, competing in the National League, reverting to the Cradley Heathens name in 2013. It ceased operating after the 2019 season, although a team bearing the Heathens name has operated under the NORA umbrella on the Isle of Wight in 2021 and 2022 and in 2022 won The Michael Richardson Trophy  .

History
Cradley Heath speedway team was formed in 1947 and first raced at Dudley Wood Stadium on 21 June 1947 after a number of away appearances prior to the opening of the newly built stadium. They raced in the 1947 Speedway National League Division Three and took the name Cradley Heath Cubs for the first two seasons.

After closure at the end of the 1952 season the track reopened in 1959 for one unlicensed meeting and in 1960 the Heathens entered the newly formed Provincial League. The club won their first silverware after winning the 1961 and 1963 Provincial League Knockout Cup (the second division cup). From 1973 to 1976 they rode under the name Cradley United.

The golden years of Cradley speedway arrived during the 1980s, the club won two league titles (1981 and 1983) and eight Knockout Cups from 1979 to 1989. During the period some of the world's leading riders rode for Cradley, including Bruce Penhall, Erik Gundersen and Jan O. Pedersen.

The club operated continuously at top flight level from 1965 to 1995, when they were evicted by the new landlords who had bought the stadium to redevelop into housing. The team survived for one additional year, competing at the Loomer Road Stadium in Stoke in 1996 under the name 'Cradley and Stoke' Heathens. The club was one of the most successful in the sport throughout the 1980s, winning the British League in 1981 and 1983 and eight Knockout Cup competitions. Seven Speedway World Championships were won by Cradley riders between 1981 and 1996.

Revival
Supporters of the club campaigned to resurrect speedway in the local area. Plans were submitted to Dudley Council for a new site. The Birmingham Brummies promoter, Tony Mole and Bob Edwards (on behalf of supporters group, CRASH – Cradley Raising Aid Saving Heathens) led the planning application and it was hoped that the team would return to racing in 2009. There was an online petition to show support for the application which was linked from the Cradley Heath Speedway website.

The Heathens returned in 2010 but with a changed name. The Cradley name was changed to Dudley Heathens temporarily until a new stadium could be found to call their own. They joined the National League and their home meetings were initially shared between two stadiums – Monmore Green (home track of the Wolverhampton Wolves) and the Perry Bar Stadium (home track of the Birmingham Brummies). The team manager was Will Pottinger, and the club was promoted by Sky Sports Speedway presenter Nigel Pearson, and now by Chris Van Straaten & Gary Patchett. Between 2011 and 2014 home matches were solely at Monmore Green, however at the end of the 2014 season it was announced they would be unable to continue racing at Monmore Green and a deal was quickly agreed to go back to the Perry Barr Stadium in Birmingham for the 2015 season. This proved short lived and at the end of the 2015 season, an agreement was reached for Wolverhampton Wolves and Cradley Heathens to ride on alternate Monday's at Monmore Green. On July 4, 2017 "Heathens Speedway Supporters Trust" lodged an Outline Planning Application with Sandwell MBC for a Sports & Recreation Village to include Speedway as a small part of the whole project on land at Lion Farm Playing Fields which already has a covenant on it for Recreation & Sport.

Name
At the time of formation the two towns were in different counties - Staffordshire and Worcestershire, but both towns are now part of the county of West Midlands. The Cradley team initially took the nickname "Cubs" but during the 1949 season, having gained promotion from the National League Division Three to the National League Division Two, they adopted the name of Cradley Heathens, which was retained through to their final days in 1996 but for the period of 1973-76 when they raced as Cradley United and 1996 when they became 'Cradley at Stoke' and raced in Stoke. The club was revived as Dudley Heathens in 2010, reverting to Cradley Heathens after the 2013 season.

Season summary

The club also operated a junior team in the British Junior League in the 
years 1986 to 1992 inclusive,

being Runners-Up in 1986 and Winners in 1991.

Club honours
British League
Champions: 1981, 1983

Knockout Cup (Div 1)
Winners: 1979, 1980, 1982, 1983, 1986+, 1987, 1988, 1989  (+shared with Oxford)

Knockout Cup (Div 2)
Winners: 1961, 1963

League Cup
Winners: 1982, 1984, 1986+ (+shared with Oxford)

Inter-League Cup
Winners: 1979

Premiership
A season-opening challenge match, held over two legs, between the previous year's League and KO Cup winners (similar to English football's Charity Shield).

Winners: 1982, 1984, 1985, 1988, 1989, 1990

Inter-League Four Team Tournament
Winners: 1980

Premier League Four Team Tournament
Winners: 1995

Midland Cup/Lge/Shield
Winners: 1950, 1951, 1963, 1980, 1983, 1984, 1987

National League
National Shield  - 2011, 2012 and 2013
National League Fours Winners - 2011, 2013 and 2014
National League Pairs Winners - 2013
National League Champions - 2013 and 2014
National League Knock Out Cup - 2013 and 2014

Individual Champions
World Champion
 Bruce Penhall - 1981, 1982
 Erik Gundersen - 1984, 1985, 1988
 Jan O. Pedersen - 1991
 Billy Hamill - 1996

Under-21 World Champion
 Gert Handberg - 1989

Long Track World Champion
 Anders Michanek - 1977
 Erik Gundersen - 1984, 1986

British Under-21 Champion
 Phil Collins - 1978
 Scott Smith - 1992

Intercontinental Champion
 Bruce Penhall - 1981
 Erik Gundersen - 1986, 1987
 Jan O. Pedersen - 1988

Overseas Champion
 Phil Collins - 1983
 Lance King - 1984
 Simon Cross - 1988

British League Riders Champion
 Erik Gundersen - 1983, 1985
 Jan O. Pedersen - 1988

National League Riders Champion
 Lee Smart - 2010

American Champion
 Bruce Penhall - 1980, 1981
 Greg Hancock - 1995

Danish Champion
 Erik Gundersen - 1983, 1984, 1985, 1986, 1989
 Jan O. Pedersen - 1988
 Gert Handberg - 1992

Swedish Champion
 Bernt Persson - 1977

Scottish Open Champion
 Phil Collins - 1983
 Greg Hancock - 1991, 1992

Australasian Champion
 John Boulger - 1976

South Australian Champion
 John Boulger - 1974, 1975, 1976

Western Australian Champion
 Simon Cross - 1987

Victorian Champion (Aust)
 Roy Trigg - 1969, 1970

Notable riders

See also
List of defunct motorcycle speedway teams in the United Kingdom

References

Further reading

External links

Cradley Heath Speedway website

British speedway teams
Sport in Dudley